Maria Grazia Alemanno (born 2 September 1990) is an Italian weightlifter. In 2021, she represented Italy at the 2020 Summer Olympics in Tokyo, Japan. She finished in 11th place in the women's 59 kg event.

Career 

She represented Italy at the 2013 Mediterranean Games held in Mersin, Turkey. She competed in the women's 69 kg event where she finished in 5th place in both the Snatch and the Clean & Jerk events. She also represented Italy at the 2018 Mediterranean Games held in Tarragona, Catalonia, Spain.

In 2020, she won the silver medal in the women's 59kg Snatch event at the Roma 2020 World Cup in Rome, Italy.

Major results

References

External links 
 

Living people
1990 births
Sportspeople from the Province of Lecce
Italian female weightlifters
Mediterranean Games competitors for Italy
Competitors at the 2013 Mediterranean Games
Competitors at the 2018 Mediterranean Games
Weightlifters at the 2020 Summer Olympics
Olympic weightlifters of Italy
21st-century Italian women